John Smith (24 April 1936 – 23 May 2008) was an English football player and manager from West Hartlepool. As a forward and midfielder, he was noted for his effective passing and aerial ability.

He played for Hartlepool United, Watford, Swindon Town, Brighton & Hove Albion, Notts County, Margate, and Ramsgate. He became player-manager of Ramsgate in 1971, and later managed Bath City, Swindon Town's youth squad, and Margate.

After retiring from managing, he ran a tea room and worked as a taxi driver in Thanet. He died in Margate on 23 May 2008.

References

1936 births
2008 deaths
People from West Hartlepool
Footballers from Hartlepool
English footballers
Hartlepool United F.C. players
Sunderland A.F.C. players
Watford F.C. players
Swindon Town F.C. players
Brighton & Hove Albion F.C. players
Notts County F.C. players
Ramsgate F.C. players
Margate F.C. players
Bath City F.C. managers
Margate F.C. managers
Association football forwards
Association football midfielders
English Football League players
English football managers
British taxi drivers